Herbert Havlik (born 24 November 1946) is an Austrian sprint canoeist who competed in the early 1980s. He was eliminated in the semifinals of both the K-2 1000 m and the K-4 1000 m events at the 1980 Summer Olympics in Moscow.

References

1946 births
Austrian male canoeists
Canoeists at the 1980 Summer Olympics
Living people
Olympic canoeists of Austria